Rathod Bapu Rao (born 12 March 1962) is an Indian politician and a legislator of Telangana Legislative Assembly. He won as MLA from Boath assembly constituency on Telangana Rashtra Samithi ticket.

Early life
He was born in Adilabad, Telangana to Narayana. He did his M.A from Osmania University.

Career
Rathod Bapu Rao won as MLA in 2014 from Boath assembly constituency.

Personal life
He is married to R. Vandhana.

References

People from Telangana
Living people
People from Adilabad
Telangana Rashtra Samithi politicians
Telangana MLAs 2014–2018
1962 births
Telangana MLAs 2018–2023